LaRoy Reynolds (born November 3, 1990) is an American football linebacker who is a free agent. He was signed by the Jacksonville Jaguars as an undrafted free agent after the 2013 NFL Draft. He played college football at the University of Virginia.

College career
After attending Matthew Fontaine Maury High School in Virginia, Reynolds played college football for the University of Virginia Cavaliers.

Professional career

Jacksonville Jaguars
After going undrafted, Reynolds made the Jacksonville Jaguars' final roster on August 30, 2013.

Reynolds was suspended by the NFL on November 12, 2013 for four games for violating the NFL policy on performance-enhancing substances.

Chicago Bears
On September 29, 2015, Reynolds signed with the Chicago Bears.

Atlanta Falcons
On March 16, 2016, Reynolds signed with the Atlanta Falcons.

In the 2016 season, Reynolds and the Falcons reached Super Bowl LI, where they faced the New England Patriots on February 5, 2017. In the Super Bowl, the Falcons fell in a 34–28 overtime defeat.

On March 9, 2017, Reynolds signed a one-year contract extension with the Falcons. He was placed on injured reserve on September 4, 2017 after suffering a pectoral injury. He was activated off injured reserve to the active roster on October 31, 2017.

Philadelphia Eagles
On May 15, 2018, Reynolds signed with the Philadelphia Eagles.

San Francisco 49ers
On May 6, 2019, Reynolds signed with the San Francisco 49ers. However, Reynolds was later released by the 49ers on August 31, 2019.

Cincinnati Bengals
On September 10, 2019, Reynolds signed with the Cincinnati Bengals.

Atlanta Falcons (second stint)
On March 25, 2020, Reynolds was signed by the Atlanta Falcons.

In Week 12 against the Las Vegas Raiders, Reynolds forced a fumble on running back Josh Jacobs and later recovered a fumble lost by quarterback Derek Carr during the 43–6 win.

New England Patriots
Reynolds signed with the New England Patriots on March 24, 2021. On May 27, 2021, Reynolds was released by the Patriots with an injury settlement.

New York Jets
On October 26, 2021, Reynolds was signed to the New York Jets practice squad. He was released on January 4, 2022.

New England Patriots (second stint)
On January 5, 2022, Reynolds was signed to the New England Patriots practice squad.

References

External links
Chicago Bears bio
Jacksonville Jaguars bio
Virginia Cavaliers bio

1990 births
Living people
Players of American football from Norfolk, Virginia
American football linebackers
Virginia Cavaliers football players
Jacksonville Jaguars players
Chicago Bears players
Atlanta Falcons players
Philadelphia Eagles players
San Francisco 49ers players
Cincinnati Bengals players
New England Patriots players
New York Jets players
Ed Block Courage Award recipients